Monopis monachella is a moth of the family Tineidae. It is widespread in Eurasia, Africa, India, Sri Lanka, Burma, Sumatra, Java, the Philippines, Taiwan, Japan, New Guinea, Samoa, North America and South America.

The wingspan is 12–20 mm. The moth flies from April to September.

The larvae feed on animal remains.

External links

 waarneming.nl 
 Lepidoptera of Belgium

Tineinae
Moths of Africa
Moths of Europe
Lepidoptera of the Republic of the Congo
Fauna of the Gambia
Moths described in 1796